The men's club throw athletics event for the 2012 Summer Paralympics took place at the London Olympic Stadium in London on 31 August. A single event incorporating 3 different classifications (F31, F32, and F51) were contested.

F31/32/51 results

References

Athletics at the 2012 Summer Paralympics
2012
2012 in men's athletics